Hallam Henry is a Barbadian politician and diplomat. He is the Barbadian ambassador to China.

References 

Living people
Barbadian politicians
Ambassadors of Barbados to China
Barbadian diplomats
Year of birth missing (living people)